New Hall School is a Catholic co-educational private boarding and day school in the village of Boreham near Chelmsford, Essex, England. It was founded in 1642 in the Low Countries, now Belgium, by sisters of the Catholic order Canonesses of the Holy Sepulchre and moved to its current location, the former Tudor Palace of Beaulieu in Essex, in 1799. It is the only Catholic Independent school in the Brentwood diocese, and one of the oldest and largest in the country.

The school operates the "diamond" model format. Up until the end of Year 6 and in the Sixth Form, the children are taught in co-educational classes. In years 7 to 11, students are taught in single sex classes. The school is a member of Catholic Independent Schools Conference and ISA, and the school principal is a member of the Headmasters' and Headmistresses' Conference.

History

The school was founded in Liège, now part of Belgium in 1642 by Susan Hawley, who also formed the English Community of the Canonesses Regular of the Holy Sepulchre. The founding Religious Order, the Canonesses Regular of the Holy Sepulchre, is one of the most ancient in the Church and was established in Europe long before the English Religious Community was founded in 1642. The school expanded considerably in size and scope from 1770 under the leadership of Mary Dennett. The school began to offer a Catholic education to girls who were denied this in England in the Post-Protestant Reformation period and to girls from other countries too. In 1794, the French Revolutionary Wars forced the nuns to leave the Low Countries. The school reopened on its present site in 1799.

In 1994, the Preparatory Divisions were re-established on the campus at New Hall. Opening with 40 pupils, the school grew rapidly over the following years. In 1995, the Preparatory Divisions welcomed its first boarders and the boarding programme was later extended to boys as well.

In 2001, New Hall appointed its first lay principal, Mrs Katherine Jeffrey. In April 2005, the administration made a landmark decision to go fully co-educational, ending over 360 years of single-sex education. The announcement was made that the Senior Divisions would be embarking on a period of further expansion, with the establishment of a separate Boys' Division (11–16) and a co-educational Sixth Form. The Senior Divisions now accepts boys throughout the 11–18 age range and there are two boys' boarding houses fully established, in addition to the two girls' boarding houses.

The move towards co-education using the "diamond model" has proved extremely successful. New Hall was commended by judges at the 2011 Independent School Awards for the "ambitious and pioneering move" and won the award for "outstanding strategic initiative". In 2016 New Hall was voted TES Independent School of the Year.

The New Hall School Trust (NHST) was established as a new registered charity (1110286) and limited company in 2005. The principal objective of the NHST, as set out in the Memorandum and Articles, is ‘to advance the Roman Catholic religion by the conduct of a Roman Catholic School’. In 2012 New Hall was invited to become the first independent school in the country to sponsor a state primary school that was seeking to become an Academy under the new Government scheme. The new academy formally opened in September 2013, forming the New Hall Multi Academy Trust (NHMAT), a partnership between New Hall School and Messing Primary School.

Buildings
Sir Thomas Boleyn inherited New Hall from his father Sir William in the late 1400s and in 1517, the estate was acquired by King Henry VIII, who greatly enlarged and enhanced the building and called it Beaulieu. The Royal Arms of Henry VIII are now to be seen in the school Chapel. For many years the home of Mary Tudor, New Hall was subsequently granted to the Earl of Sussex by Queen Elizabeth I. Oliver Cromwell later procured the estate for 5 shillings.

Having fallen into disrepair and been somewhat pillaged, the house was bought by a Dutch trader John Olmius in 1738 who refashioned the north wing as a self-contained house with a new entrance and bay windows, interior plasterwork and panelling. Under the reign of George III, he became the 1st Baron Waltham of Philpstown.

Houses
There are six vertical houses named after figures venerated in the Catholic church:

 Acutis House 
 Augustine House 
 Bahkita House 
 Miki House 
 Romero House 
 Teresa House 
 
The Preparatory Divisions Houses are named after the Four Evangelists, the saints who wrote the Four Gospels:
 St Matthew (Red)
 St Mark (Yellow)
 St Luke (Green)
 St John (Blue)

The Boarding Houses are named as follows:

 Earle Wing, Petre House
 Hawley House
 Petre House
 Dennett House
 Campion House

Academic
New Hall has a strong academic record and regularly tops the exam results table for Essex county. In the 2021 A Levels, it achieved a 97% pass rate at grades A*-B and 75% at A*/A. At GCSE, 79% of grades were 7+ (A*/A).

The curriculum is broad and well balanced, tailored to the needs of the individual. Specialist subject provision starts in the Preparatory Division with science, modern and classical languages and politics. New Hall has the largest politics department and the largest theology department of any school in the country; subjects such as psychology, business and economics are three of the 20+ options at A Level, while the thriving Classics department offers both Latin and Greek at GCSE and A Level.

School clubs also cater for a diverse range of co-curricular interests such as robotics and coding, astronomy, Chinese language and culture, and History of Art.

Around 85% of students gained places at their first-choice university in 2021, 60% of which are in the Russell Group.

Pastoral care
Pupils are required to attend regular chapel services. Practising Catholic pupils may choose to actively participate in spiritual activities such as Bible studies and the annual pilgrimage to Lourdes. The school chapel runs weekly Sunday mass which is open to the public and serves the Parish of St Augustine of Canterbury, Springfield. Pupils and staff often serve as musicians, choristers, altar servers, sacristans and readers.

Co-curricular activities

Sport
Students compete at county, regional, national and international level in a wide range of sports and have met with success. In recent years, there has been a significant investment in the sports facilities on campus. The first-class provision now includes: The Waltham Centre 25m 6-lane indoor swimming pool; a national standard athletics track and floodlit Astroturf; 10 floodlit tennis/netball courts; two sports halls; Parsons Hall dance studio; junior and senior cricket wickets and indoor training nets; hockey, rugby and football pitches. New Hall also has well-established links with a local riding school and a golf club.

The more popular sports are cricket, hockey, netball, rugby, and tennis. There is a wide variety of other sports, including aerobics & pilates, athletics, badminton, basketball, cross country, fencing, football, golf, riding, swimming, volleyball and triathlon.

Performing arts

The Walkfares Performing Arts Centre is the home of thriving Music, Dance and Drama Departments. Performances, from Shakespeare to modern plays and musicals, give students the opportunity to develop their confidence and creative talents.

All students are encouraged to participate in the English Speaking Board (ESB), Trinity or London Academy of Music and Dramatic Art (LAMDA) programmes. Students take individual lessons in orchestral instruments, piano, singing, drums and electric guitars. A growing number of students take lessons on the newly restored Norman & Beard organ in the chapel.

There is a host of performing groups, including senior and junior choirs, chamber choirs, a chapel choir, a senior orchestra, a strings academy, wind bands, a guitar ensemble, and chamber groups. Students are also encouraged to form jazz and pop bands and specialist support and facilities are available.

Regular performances are given by students in assemblies, lunchtime recitals and formal concerts. Students take part in regional and national musical festivals and competitions, and groups tour regularly to perform in major venues in Europe.

New Hall School Choir has performed at St. Peters, Rome, St. Marks, Venice, Westminster Cathedral, London as well as on BBC Television. The choir sings a wide range of music from sacred to secular, classic to modern.

The Dance Company was founded in September 2003 to facilitate the increased demand from students who wanted more opportunities to train and perform. The company has students from Year 10 upwards. The company has taken part in a variety of events in and around Chelmsford and has an important role in supporting the Dance Department within the School.

Drama forms a significant part of student activity at New Hall. Each year the Senior School produces a large scale production just before Christmas during which many students experience the exhilaration of being part of this tradition. Recent productions have included 'Footloose', 'Shakespeare in Love', 'Oliver', 'Othello' and 'West Side Story' and students from all age groups play the leading parts. Other notable productions are provided by the Drama and Theatre Studies students whose productions have included Woyzeck, Waiting for Godot, Teechers, Arabian Nights and Grimm Tales. Students have the option to do GCSE and A Level drama.

The Eaton Theatre, equipped with lighting and sound technology, provides a traditional performance venue whilst in Walkfares, two well equipped, versatile studios provide the environment for both teaching and for a range of performances. The nearby Jubilee Hall also was fitted with lights and retractable seating and is where weekly assemblies are held. The new outdoor Walkfares Canopy, erected in 2020, allowed New Hall to resume theatrical and musical performances and events as soon as practically possible in the covid pandemic.

Past headmistresses and principals

At Liege and then in England it can be assumed that the Prioress was also in charge of the school. At some unknown stage a First Mistress became a quasi-Headmistress in the school under the Prioress. The term headmistress was first used in 1942 and the term principal from 2005.

Acclaimed former pupils

Former pupils are known as "Old Fishes" or "New Hallians". The term Old Fishes was used for former pupils from as early as 1799. At the time of Catholic persecution in mainland Europe, the founding Religious Community were forced to leave the Low Countries and to move to England. Whilst they were seeking a suitable venue in England, the nuns used the word "Fishes" as a code word for students and the term eventually stuck.

Christiane Amanpour, chief international correspondent for CNN
Cindy Buxton, wildlife film-maker
Joanna Scanlan, actor and writer
Leonora Carrington, surrealist artist
Anya Hindmarch, fashion accessories designer
Denise Holt, diplomat
Amber Rudd, British politician, former Home Secretary
Emma Gilbey Keller, author and journalist
Sarah Ferguson, investigative journalist, writer
Felicity Landon, freelance journalist
Amanda Stretton, racing driver and motoring journalist
Virginia Maskell, English actress
Gina Rippon, professor of cognitive neuroimaging and author
 Rose Glass, film & TV writer/ director
Dom Morris, Saracens rugby player
Sarah Clarke, Queen's Counsel
Theo Stevenson, actor
Kayleigh McEvoy, soprano
Sascha Williams, TV presenter
Oli Morris, Worcester Warriors rugby player
Tomiwa Agbongbon, Leicester Tigers rugby player
Ella Lambert, founder of the Pachamama Project (fighting period poverty)
Nathan Hubble, actor and writer
Jessica Tappin, GB heptathlete
Connor Worsdall, golfer
Emma Parry, founder of Help for Heroes
Kate O'Sullivan, contemporary fine artist
Chloe Hurst, actress
Amy-Beth Ellice, cook and author
Nathan Lambert, musician

Notable staff
 Nasser Hussain, cricket
Jennifer Rice, international swimmer
Matilda Callaghan, cricket

Further reading 

 Fishy Tales: Living Memories of New Hall 1930-2012, The Canonesses of The Holy Sepulchre, 2012 ISBN 978 09574063 0 8
 New Hall and its school: A true story of virtuous demeanour,  Tony Tuckwell, Free Range Publishing 2006 ISBN 1-872979-02-5

See also 
 New Hall School official website
 New Hall School Twitter Site
 Canonesses of the Holy Sepulchre
 Time Team Special on New Hall

References

External links

 New Hall School website
 Profile on the ISC website
 Profile on the HMC website
Profile on the Good Schools Guide

Educational institutions established in the 1640s
Private schools in Essex
Catholic boarding schools in England
Member schools of the Girls' Schools Association
Member schools of the Headmasters' and Headmistresses' Conference
Roman Catholic private schools in the Diocese of Brentwood
Boarding schools in Essex
Diamond schools
1642 establishments in the Holy Roman Empire
Boreham